Trolla may refer to:

Places
Trolla, a village in Trondheim Municipality, Sør-Trøndelag county, Norway
Trolla, Estonia, a village in Võru County, Estonia
Trolla (mountain), a mountain in Sunndal Municipality, Møre og Romsdal county, Norway

People
Heiki Trolla, an Estonian artist better known as Navitrolla